Below is a sortable list of compositions by Frank Bridge.  The works are categorized by genre, Hindmarsh catalogue number (H.), date of composition and title.

Sources
 Hindmarsh, Paul. Frank Bridge: A Thematic Catalogue, 1900-1941. London: Faber Music, 1983.

References

Bridge